Prom Meesawat (born 21 July 1984) is a Thai professional golfer. He won his age group at the World Junior Golf Championships in 1997 and 2002 and was Asia Pacific Junior Champion several times. He won the Thailand Open Amateur Championship in 2001, 2002 and 2003 and was victorious in a professional tournament as a fifteen-year-old amateur. He turned professional in 2004 and joined the Asian Tour. In 2005 he had five top ten finishes on Asian Tour and won a professional event in Thai circuit. His first Asian Tour win came at the 2006 SK Telecom Open in South Korea.

In 2012 a string of good results in Asian Tour events that were co-sanctioned with the European Tour earned Meesawat full playing rights on the European Tour for 2013. Prom lost his European Tour card in 2015 and returned to the Asian Tour full-time. In January 2019, Messawat qualified for the 2019 Open Championship with a top-4 finish at the SMBC Singapore Open.

Professional wins (10)

Asian Tour wins (2)

*Note: The 2006 SK Telecom Open was shortened to 54 holes due to rain.
1Co-sanctioned by the Korean Tour

Asian Tour playoff record (1–4)

Asian Development Tour wins (1)

All Thailand Golf Tour wins (7) 
1999 Singha Masters (as an amateur)
2005 TPC Tour Championships
2006 Singha Pattaya Open
2011 Singha Pattaya Open1
2012 Singha Pattaya Open1
2019 Singha Thailand Masters
2020 Singha Pattaya Open
1Co-sanctioned by the ASEAN PGA Tour

Playoff record
European Tour playoff record (0–1)

Challenge Tour playoff record (0–1)

OneAsia Tour playoff record (0–1)

Results in major championships

CUT = missed the halfway cut
Note: Meesawat only played in The Open Championship.

Results in World Golf Championships

"T" = Tied
Note that the HSBC Champions did not become a WGC event until 2009.

Team appearances
Amateur
Eisenhower Trophy (representing Thailand): 2002
Bonallack Trophy (representing Asia/Pacific): 2002 (winners)

Professional
Royal Trophy (representing Asia): 2007
World Cup (representing Thailand): 2018
Amata Friendship Cup (representing Thailand): 2018 (winners)

References

External links

Prom Meesawat
Asian Tour golfers
European Tour golfers
Japan Golf Tour golfers
Golfers at the 2002 Asian Games
Prom Meesawat
Southeast Asian Games medalists in golf
Prom Meesawat
Competitors at the 2001 Southeast Asian Games
1984 births
Living people